Ayuso may refer to:

People 

Elías Larry Ayuso (born 1977), Puerto Rican basketball player
Esther Ayuso (born 1958), the first female Belizean architect
Isabel Díaz Ayuso (born 1978), Spanish politician
Joaquín Ayuso (born 1955), Spanish businessman
Juan Ayuso (born 2002), Spanish cyclist
Manuel Sánchez Ayuso (1941–1982), Spanish economist and politician
María del Pilar Ayuso González (born 1942), Spanish politician and Member of the European Parliament
Miguel Ángel Ayuso Guixot (born 1952), Spanish prelate of the Catholic Church and an historian of Islam
Marisol Ayuso (born 1943), Spanish stage, movie and television actress
Omar Ayuso (born 1998), Spanish actor

Places 

Heras de Ayuso, municipality located in the province of Guadalajara, Castile-La Mancha, Spain
Navares de Ayuso, municipality located in the province of Segovia, Castile and León, Spain